House Of Prince is an electronica and dance music duo consisting of vocalist Oezlem Cetin and producer Gerret Frerichs.  In 1998 they hit #1 on the Hot Dance Music/Club Play chart with the song "Perfect Love".  The track was officially credited to House Of Prince featuring Oezlem.

See also
List of number-one dance hits (United States)
List of artists who reached number one on the US Dance chart

References

German house music groups
German electronic music groups
German dance music groups